Gavin Quinn is an Australian former professional rugby league footballer who played in the 2000s. He played for the Newcastle Knights in 2003.

He won the Newcastle Rugby League grand final in 2010 with the Maitland Pickers.

External links
Statistics at rugbyleagueproject.org

1981 births
Living people
Australian rugby league players
Central Charlestown Butcher Boys players
Maitland Pickers players
Newcastle Knights players
Place of birth missing (living people)
Rugby league wingers